Ouragan  may refer to:

 Possibly an old name for Columbia River
 French destroyer Ouragan, which also served in the Polish Navy during World War II
 The Ouragan-class landing platform dock of the French Navy and the lead ship of the class
 Dassault Ouragan French jet fighter aircraft
 French for European windstorm
 "Ouragan (song)", a 1986 single by Princess Stéphanie of Monaco
 An abbreviation of "Offre urbaine renouvelée et améliorée gérée par un automatisme nouveau", a communications-based train control system in use on Paris Métro Line 13
 , 2016 French documentary